Brittany Wenger (born 1994) is an American student who was the first-place winner of the Google Science Fair in 2012. Wenger currently studies at Duke University.

For her entry into the science fair, Wenger trained a statistical model to predict signs of breast cancer given nine features from the breast tissue samples as an input representation. She used neural networks to train the develop the statistical model, which is currently 99.1 percent sensitive to malignancy. As the first-place winner, she received a $50,000 scholarship.

Wenger spoke about her software at the TEDx Atlanta conference in 2012, and TEDx CERN conference in 2013. In 2013, representing Out-of-Door Academy, she was a finalist in the Intel Science Talent Search and was awarded 8th place.

References

External links 
The Out-of-Door Academy
Brittany Wenger's app
"'Stroke of Genius: Brittany Wenger ". Thunderstrokes.

Angier B. Duke Scholars
Living people
Duke University people
1994 births